The Nashville Vols minor league baseball team played 62 seasons from its creation in Nashville, Tennessee, in 1901 through its final season of 1963. The club played in 9,019 regular season games and compiled a win–loss record of 4,571–4,448 (.507). They had a post-season record of 110–77–1 (.588). This list documents top players in particular statistical areas.

The Nashville Baseball Club was formed as a charter member of the newly organized Class B Southern Association in 1901. The team did not receive their official moniker, the Nashville Volunteers, until 1908. However, the team was, and is, commonly referred to as the Vols. Their last season in the Southern Association was 1961. After sitting out the 1962 season, the Vols returned for a final season as a part of the South Atlantic League in 1963.

Eight Vols players won the Southern Association Most Valuable Player Award, the league's only award. Of the 1,215 players to have played for the Vols, 103 players distinguished themselves by leading the league in statistical categories during a season. Bob Lennon led the Southern Association in five areas in 1954: batting average (.345), hits (210), runs (139), RBI (161), and home runs (64). In 1942, Charlie English led the league in four categories: batting average (.341), hits (217), RBI (139), and doubles (50). In 1943, Ed Sauer led the league in four areas: batting average (.368), runs (113), doubles (51), and stolen bases (30). Twenty-nine other players also led in multiple categories in single seasons.

Five players hold Southern Association records for single-season performances. Les Fleming holds the batting average record (.414 in 1941), Charlie Gilbert the runs record (178 in 1948), Jim Poole the RBI record (167 in 1930), Joe Dwyer the doubles record (65 in 1936), and Bob Lennon the home run record (64 in 1954).

Table key

Award winners

Southern Association MVP

Eight Vols were awarded the Southern Association Most Valuable Player Award, more than any other team in the league. Nashville players won the award for three years in a row from 1948 to 1950.

All-time Vols teams
Nashville Banner sportswriters Fred Russell and George Leonard created all-time team lists of the top Nashville players from 1901 to 1919 and from 1920 to 1963.

1901–1919

1920–1963

League leaders

Batting leaders

These players led all other players in the league in particular statistical batting categories in a single season.

Pitching leaders

These players led all other players in the league in particular statistical pitching categories in a single season.

Notes
 Greek George and Emil Mailho of the Atlanta Crackers were named Co-MVPs in 1940.

References

awards and league leaders